Matanuska-Susitna Valley (known locally as the Mat-Su or The Valley) is an area in Southcentral Alaska south of the Alaska Range about  north of Anchorage, Alaska.
It is known for the world record sized cabbages and other vegetables displayed annually in Palmer at the Alaska State Fair.
It includes the valleys of the Matanuska, Knik, and Susitna Rivers.
11,000 of Mat-Su Valley residents commute to Anchorage for work (as of 2008).
It is the fastest growing region in Alaska and includes the towns of Palmer, Wasilla,  Big Lake, Houston, Willow, Sutton, and Talkeetna. The Matanuska-Susitna Valley is primarily the land of the Dena'ina and Ahtna Athabaskan people.

The valleys are shaped by three mountain ranges: the Alaska Range, the Talkeetna Mountains and the Chugach Mountains. The Matanuska-Susitna Valley was carved by glaciers
leaving thousands of lakes.
The Mat-Su rivers and lakes are home to the spawning grounds of chinook, coho, sockeye, pink, and chum salmon.
The area is home to 31 state parks and campgrounds.

The  Matanuska-Susitna Borough (the Alaskan equivalent of a county) governs the Mat-Su Valley.
According to the 2020 Census, the borough's population is 107,081, a 21.7% increase since 2010.

The City of Wasilla was founded on Dena'ina land when the Alaska Railroad was constructed in 1917. Knik, also on Dena'ina land, was the first boom-town in the valley and predates Wasilla. In 1893 the Alaska Commercial Company was built at Knik, and in 1898 Knik was settled by trappers and gold miners.

Talkeetna began in the late 1890s, with the construction of a trading station and later the Alaska Railroad. Today, Talkeetna serves as a tourist hotspot, and the starting point for mountaineers who climb Denali.

The Mat-Su Valley was explored by Russians in 1818.

In 1935, as part of the New Deal 203 families from the Midwest travelled to Alaska and started the Matanuska Valley Colony. Families were specifically chosen from the states of Minnesota, Wisconsin and Michigan, due to their similarly cold winter climates.

The 1939 Slattery Report on Alaskan development identified the region as one of the areas where new settlements would be established through Jewish immigration. This plan was never implemented.

The region is also home to the Matanuska-Susitna College
and the Mat-Su Valley Frontiersman newspaper.

See also

Anchorage metropolitan area
Goose Bay Airport (Alaska)
Matanuska Formation
Matanuska-Susitna Borough, Alaska

References

External links
Alaska Census data
Matanuska-Susitna Borough website

Valleys of Alaska
Landforms of Matanuska-Susitna Borough, Alaska
Regions of Alaska